Tehran has grown dramatically since Mohammad Khan Qajar chose it as the capital of the Qajar dynasty in 1796. Despite the occurrence of earthquakes during the Qajar period and before, some buildings still remain from Tehran's era of antiquity. However, most of Tehran's historic architecture has been obliterated by the wave of hasty modernization that swept through the capital over the last 40 to 50 years. Of the eight city gates of old Tehran, none remain today. The Qajar culture flowered into a mature form of vernacular architecture, and many relics today remain of this tradition. Most, however, are government offices and residences of the royal elite. The "Kushak" of Ahmad Shah in the Niavaran Palace Complex is an example of this tradition.

Many of the urban designs of modern Tehran are attributed to Victor Gruen. Gruen devised a master plan for many of northern Tehran's neighborhoods between the years 1963–1967. Many palaces were built and by the late 1970s. Tehran had grown so large that Ray, a former satellite and city in itself, became connected to the ever-expanding "Greater Tehran". Pahlavi architecture tried incorporated themes from European Modern architecture. The "White House" of Sadabad Palace and the main Palace of Niavaran are examples of this architectural style.

Features of the city include gates and palaces. Despite the chaotic sprawl of Tehran, many designers are gradually incorporating aesthetics in their designs, and international awards have been given to projects in the city.

See also 
Ferdows Garden
Goldis Tower
Iranian architecture
List of tallest buildings in Tehran
Sharifa-ha House
Tehran International Tower

References

External links
 
 Library of Congress on Tehran's Architectural Conference
 US State Dept on the Conference
 On the Shahyad (Azadi) Tower
 Photos from the changing face of Tehran
 Modernized Iranian architecture in Tehran (Video, 6 min 48 sec), Press TV, 26 September 2010.
  Tehranimages. Contemporary photos taken in some of the oldest districts of Tehran.

Tehran
 
Culture in Tehran